Joshua Chad Brecheen (born June 19, 1979) is an American politician from the U.S. state of Oklahoma who has served as the U.S. representative for Oklahoma's 2nd congressional district since 2023. He represented the 6th district in the Oklahoma Senate from 2010 to 2018. He is a citizen of the Choctaw Nation.

Early life and career
Joshua Chad Brecheen was born on June 19, 1979. He attended Southeastern Oklahoma State University in Durant. In 1997, he was first elected as SE District Vice-president of the Oklahoma FFA. The next year, he was elected State FFA President, moved to Stillwater, and transferred to Oklahoma State University. He served as State FFA President until 1999.

After retiring from the FFA, Brecheen graduated from Oklahoma State University with a dual degree in animal science and agricultural communications. In 2004, he was hired as a field representative for U.S. senator Tom Coburn, where he worked until his election to the Oklahoma Senate. He owns a motivational speaking business, Brecheen Keynotes and Seminars, as well as Rawhide Dirtworks, an excavation service.

Oklahoma Senate career
Brecheen filed to run for the Oklahoma Senate's 6th district in 2010. He ran unopposed in the Republican primary and faced incumbent Democratic Senator Jay Paul Gumm. Brecheen defeated Gumm in the November election. The Tulsa World reported the 6th Senate district race as having the highest fundraising total for a State Senate seat in 2010, with Brecheen raising $217,548 and Gumm $289,786.

During his first term, Brecheen filed a bill to repeal Oklahoma's Pet Breeders Act, which required breeders provide their animals with minimum veterinary care, food and water. The bill established fees that pet breeders would pay the state to cover the costs of inspections. Brecheen argued the bill punished law-abiding citizens. He also filed a Senate resolution to have the Oklahoma Legislature meet every other year instead of annually and cut legislators pay, and introduced legislation to cut the Art in Public Places program, which provided funding to public art projects in the state. Brecheen also filed SB 554 to allow teachers to teach "the debate of creation vs. evolution" in Oklahoma public schools.

Brecheen served in the Oklahoma Senate until 2018. He retired after two terms, citing a commitment to term limits.

Brecheen was criticized by the National Center for Science Education for introducing several education bills modeled on anti-evolution bills from Texas, Tennessee, and Louisiana during his senate tenure.

U.S House of Representatives

Elections

2022 

In 2022, Brecheen ran for Oklahoma's 2nd congressional district in a 14-candidate Republican primary to succeed retiring congressman Markwayne Mullin. Mullin retired to run in a special election for U.S. Senate. He styled himself during the campaign as "Tom Coburn's protégé" and vowed to vote "no" on any tax increases. Brecheen advanced to a runoff election with Avery Frix after placing second in the primary. He defeated Frix in the runoff, winning the nomination. During the primary Brecheen's campaign was supported by $3.2 million in political action committee spending in support of his campaign or in opposition to Frix, including $1.8 million in support from a Club for Growth affiliated political action committee. He defeated Democratic nominee Naomi Andrews and independent "Bulldog" Ben Robinson in the general election.

Tenure
During the first round of voting in the 2023 House Speaker election, Brecheen cast the sole vote for Representative Jim Banks. He switched his support to Representative Jim Jordan on the second and third ballots, then to Representative Byron Donalds for the next three ballots. On the third day of the speakership election, Brecheen voted for Donalds again on the seventh ballot. On the eighth ballot, he voted for Kevin Hern after Hern was nominated by Representative Lauren Boebert. He voted for Hern again on the ninth, tenth, and 11th ballots. He switched his support to Kevin McCarthy on the 12th ballot after McCarthy agreed to additional reforms to the House rules.

Syria
In 2023, Brecheen was among 47 Republicans to vote in favor of H.Con.Res. 21 which directed President Joe Biden to remove U.S. troops from Syria within 180 days.

Caucus memberships 

 Freedom Caucus

Personal life 
Brecheen is a citizen of the Choctaw Nation.

Election results

2022

References

External links
 Congressman Josh Brecheen official U.S. House website
Josh Brecheen for Congress
 
 

|-

|-

1979 births
20th-century Native Americans
21st-century Native Americans
21st-century American politicians
American nationalists
American Protestants
Christians from Oklahoma
Choctaw Nation of Oklahoma state legislators in Oklahoma
Living people
Motivational speakers from Oklahoma
Native American Christians
Native American members of the United States Congress
People from Coalgate, Oklahoma
Protestants from Oklahoma
Republican Party members of the United States House of Representatives from Oklahoma
Republican Party Oklahoma state senators
Right-wing populism in the United States
Southeastern Oklahoma State University alumni